Slab climbing is a type of rock climbing where the rock face is at an angle less steep than vertical. It is characterized by balance- and friction-dependent moves on very small holds. It is often not leadable, or climbable from the ground up, unless it has pre-drilled bolts to protect the climb, making most slab climbs either top rope climbing or sport climbing. Special techniques such as smearing are necessary to climb slab. It is a type of face climbing and is distinctly different from crack climbing. Slab climbing is a relatively new area of climbing, having become more popular in the last 30 years, and some of the highest graded routes are currently being realized.

History 
The first routes put up on new cliffs almost always follow cracks, due to the ease of placing protection, or pieces of equipment which arrest a fall, while on lead. Slab climbs rarely have cracks or other  features that can be protected. Therefore, slab climbs are usually discovered well after the cracks are all climbed, since easier routes to the summit exist. As a result, it was not until the introduction of bolting routes that hard slab lines could be climbed. In 1927, Laurent Grivel designed the first rock drill and expansion bolt, which paved the way for protecting climbs such as slab. The next advancement for slab climbing did not come until 1980 when Boreal marketed the first "sticky rubber" shoe, making friction climbing more feasible. Before this, most climbing was done in boots or thick-soled shoes, which prevents the climber from making the balance dependent moves required on slab walls. 
Slab climbing saw a dramatic increase in the number of new routes with the introduction of lightweight, electric drills in the 1980s, but slowed as criticism of permanent bolting grew, and electric drills became illegal in many National Parks and Wilderness Areas. A new generation of climbers has begun to revive slab climbing, putting up some of the hardest routes in the world.

Techniques 

Slab climbing is one of the most technically demanding styles of climbing. Unlike overhanging or vertical routes, where strong muscles are very important, slab climbing demands intense concentration and precise foot placement.

Smearing
A central technique used on slab walls is smearing: placing a foot directly on smooth rock where no feature exists. Pressure is applied and the friction between the shoe and the rock allows the climber to move on the wall. Smearing performance depends on a climber's shoe and the type of rock. Sticky rubber shoes increase friction. Smooth rock, such as quartzite, is difficult to smear on, while sandstone or granite is much easier.  The angle of the slab also plays a large part in the difficulty of the move. A 60 degree slab is easier to smear on than an 80 degree slab. A good smear also puts as much shoe in contact with the rock as possible. The foot should be kept flat, instead of using just the points of the toes to smear.

Body placement
Climbers must keep their center of gravity directly above their feet in slab climbing. A climber that keeps their weight too close to the wall risks pushing their feet off the wall. This means a climber will often have their hips away from the rock, which is the opposite of traditional climbing technique. A climber’s hands are often used to assist in this positioning by pushing out against the wall.

Movement
Slab climbing requires smooth movement over the rock, instead of long, jerky moves. Short steps should be taken to maintain balance, and the arms should be kept in contact with the rock. Slab climbing almost never has dynamic moves.

Falls
Falling is usually dangerous on slab because of poor protection and the nature of the rock. The climber will often slide or tumble down the rock, instead of dropping through the air. This can cause serious skin injuries. When falling, climbers try to stay upright and slide instead of tumbling.

Types of rock 

Rough rock is excellent for slab climbing. Sandstone and granite are both excellent for slab climbing, because the rock provides much friction, making smearing easier. Limestone slab climbs are more difficult, due to the smoothness of the rock, and quartzite slab climbs are even rarer due to the polished nature of the rock.

See also 
 List of climbers
 List of climbing topics
 List of climbing knots
 Glossary of climbing terms

References 

Types of climbing